Fairy Tale is a Canadian LGBT dating television series.

Hosted by Nelson Tomé and produced by Canadian media company Hiltz Squared Media Group, with producer Eryn Billings, the program premiered on PrideVision in 2003, and aired for two seasons. One of the show's first contestants was comedian Trevor Boris, who was later also a writer for the series.

References

External links
 

OutTV (Canadian TV channel) original programming
2003 Canadian television series debuts
2005 Canadian television series endings
2000s Canadian reality television series
2000s LGBT-related reality television series
2000s Canadian LGBT-related television series
Canadian dating and relationship reality television series
Canadian LGBT-related reality television series